Grevillea makinsonii is a species of flowering plant in the family Proteaceae and is endemic to the south-west of Western Australia. It is an erect shrub with egg-shaped to more or less spatula-shaped leaves, and clusters of cream-coloured to pale yellow flowers.

Description

Taxonomy
Grevillea makinsonii was first formally described in 1986 by Donald McGillivray in his book New Names in Grevillea (Proteaceae) from specimens collected near Arrino in 1969. The specific epithet (makinsonii) honours Robert Owen Makinson.

Distribution and habitat
This grevillea grows in heath on sandplains in the area around Arrino, Three Springs and Eneabba in the Avon Wheatbelt, Geraldton Sandplains bioregions of south-western Western Australia.

Conservation status
Grevillea makinsonii is listed as "Priority Three" by the Government of Western Australia Department of Biodiversity, Conservation and Attractions, meaning that it is poorly known and known from only a few locations but is not under imminent threat.

See also
 List of Grevillea species

References

makinsonii
Proteales of Australia
Eudicots of Western Australia
Taxa named by Donald McGillivray
Plants described in 1986